Qendër may refer to the following places in Albania:

Qendër, Fier, an administrative unit in the Fier municipality
Qendër, Malësi e Madhe, an administrative unit of the Malësi e Madhe municipality
Qendër Bilisht, a village in the Devoll municipality
Qendër Bulgarec, a village in the Korçë municipality
Qendër Dukas, a village in the Mallakastër municipality
Qendër Ersekë, a village in the Kolonjë municipality
Qendër Leskovik, a village in the Kolonjë municipality
Qendër Libohovë, a village in the Gjirokastër municipality
Qendër Librazhd, a village in the Librazhd municipality
Qendër Piskovë, a village in the Përmet municipality
Qendër Skrapar, a village in the Skrapar municipality
Qendër Tepelenë, a village  in the Tepelenë municipality
Qendër Tomin, a village in the Dibër municipality
Qendër Vlorë, a village in the Vlorë municipality